Alexander Lvovich Davydov (1773–1833) was a major-general of the Russian Empire, who served in the era of the Napoleonic Wars.

Biography
Davydov was born to the prominent Russian noble family of the Davydovs, and was the half-brother of the noted general Nikolay Raevsky. He started his military career around the age of 12, when he enlisted in the Lifeguard Preobrezhansky Regiment as a sergeant. However, he soon transferred to the Life Guard Horse Regiment, of which, in 1799, he became a cornet and several years later, on 7 June 1804, a colonel (polkovnik). Some months later, in 1805, he fought at the Battle of Austerlitz and in the years 1807-09 he served in Poland and in Finland with the Grodno Hussar Regiment. However, on 23 January 1810 he took a discharge, due to poor health. In 1812, amidst the French invasion of Russia by Napoleon, Alexander Davydov returned to the army and served under Mikhail Miloradovich at the battles of Tarutino, Maloyaroslavets, Vyazma, and lastly Krasny. For his efforts at Krasny, he received the Order of St. Vladimir (3rd class). In the ensuing year, in 1813, he served at the battles of Lützen,  Bautzen, Dresden (received Order of St. George, 4th class) and lastly Kulm. 1814 would be his last year of military action, and he served at the battles of Bar-sur-Aube, Troyes, Arcis-sur-Aube, Fère-Champenoise and lastly Paris. On 16 June 1815, Alexander Davydov was promoted to the rank of major-general, with, as Prof. Alexander Mikaberidze adds, having "seniority" for this rank since 29 January 1814.

References

Sources
 
 
 История кавалергандов и Кавалергардского Ея Величества полка, с 1724 по 1-е июля 1851 года. Санкт-Петербург, Военная типография, 1851 г. (in Russian)
 

1773 births
1833 deaths
Russian nobility
Imperial Russian major generals
Russian commanders of the Napoleonic Wars
Recipients of the Pour le Mérite (military class)
Recipients of the Order of St. Vladimir, 3rd class
Recipients of the Gold Sword for Bravery
Recipients of the Order of St. Anna, 2nd class